Björn Ottenheim is drummer, singer and co-founder of the Dutch music band zZz. He lives in Badhoevedorp, near Amsterdam. Before the formation of zZz in 2001 he was also the drummer of Dutch punk band Hernia.

External links
Sound of zZz Official HomePage

Living people
Dutch drummers
Male drummers
Year of birth missing (living people)
Place of birth missing (living people)
People from Haarlemmermeer